Rishyasringan is a 1997 Indian Malayalam film directed by Suresh Unnithan and starring Bhanupriya and Krishna in the lead roles.

Cast
 Bhanupriya as Poornima
 Krishna as Arun
 Thilakan
 Nedumudi Venu
 Janakaraj

Soundtrack

The film features songs composed by Johnson and written by S. Ramesan Nair.

References

External links

1997 films
1990s Malayalam-language films